Savina Petrilli (29 August 1851 - 18 April 1923) was an Italian Roman Catholic professed religious who founded the Sisters of the Poor of Saint Catherine of Siena upon receiving the encouragement of Pope Pius IX.

Petrilli devoted her order to the alleviation of the poor while catering to those people who came to the congregation seeking help. She opened her first international house in Brazil after her order was established though managed the house in Siena where she lived until her death from cancer in 1923.

Her beatification was celebrated on 24 April 1988. Her feast in the liturgical calendar is assigned to 18 April.

Life
Savina Petrilli was born on 29 August 1851 in Siena as the second daughter of Celso Petrilli and Matilde Venturini; her sister was Emilia. At the age of ten - in 1861 - she read an account of the life of Catherine of Siena that instilled in her a strong devotion to her. Petrilli had her First Communion at the age of twelve in 1863.

Petrilli later made a vow to God in which she pledged to remain a virgin at the age of seventeen in 1868. She served as part of the Marian movement  from the age of fifteen and was appointed its president in 1873. In 1869 she was received in a private audience with Pope Pius IX who invited her to establish a religious congregation devoted to Catherine of Siena upon learning that she was from Siena. Petrilli then confided her plan to establish an order to her sister Emilia who was on the verge of death.

She - alongside five others - made her solemn profession as a professed religious on 15 August 1873 - the date of her order's establishment. The new order received the approval of the Archbishop of Siena Enrico Bindi. She and her new professed sisters moved to a new house in the name of the Sisters of the Poor of Saint Catherine of Siena on 7 September 1874 with the approval of the archbishop. The congregation opened their first house in Onano in 1881 and their first mission in Brazil in 1903. The papal decree of praise of Pope Leo XIII for the order was issued in 1891. The constitution of the order was approved as being implemented for a brief period on September 5, 1899 and approved in full after Pope Pius X approved it in a decree on 17 June 1906.

Petrilli died on 18 April 1923 at 5:20pm in Siena due to cancer. Her order now operates in Latin America in both Brazil and Argentina while it spread and operates in the United States of America and India. As of 2005 there were 589 religious in a total of 87 houses.

Beatification
The beatification process for Petrilli commenced with a diocesan process in Siena that was tasked with compiling evidence of her deeds during her life as well as compiling a comprehensive account of her life. The process also took possession of her writings so that theologians could ascertain if the writings adhered to the magisterium of the Roman Catholic Church - the writings were approved in a decree of 21 December 1968.

These processes commenced despite the fact that the Congregation for the Causes of Saints did not grant their formal and full approval to the cause's initiation until 15 October 1981 in a move that also granted Petrilli the posthumous title of Servant of God - the first stage in the process. The second diocesan process opened not long after this while both were granted a decree of ratification following the closure of that process. The ratification asserted that the process completed all the work assigned to it.

The Positio - a large dossier on her deeds as well as a biographical account - was compiled and submitted to officials at the C.C.S. in Rome for their own evaluation in 1985. It led to Pope John Paul II proclaiming Petrilli to be Venerable on 16 November 1985.

The single miracle needed for Petrilli's beatification was investigated in the diocese of its origin and was ratified in 1986 before being sent to Rome for extensive evaluation. John Paul II approved the healing to be a credible miracle in 1987 and beatified her on 24 April 1988.

See also
School Sacred Heart of Jesus

References

External links
Hagiography Circle

1851 births
1923 deaths
19th-century venerated Christians
19th-century Italian people
20th-century venerated Christians
20th-century Italian people
Beatifications by Pope John Paul II
Deaths from cancer in Tuscany
Founders of Catholic religious communities
Italian beatified people
People from Siena
Venerated Catholics by Pope John Paul II